Haji Ghulam Ghaus is an Afghan politician who has been appointed as the Acting Deputy Minister of Disaster Management on 21 September 2021.

References 

Living people
Afghan politicians
Year of birth missing (living people)